HMS Fowey was a 32-gun fifth rate built at Chatham Dockyard in 1703/05. She spent her career in the Mediterranean and was taken by the French off Cape Gato, Spain in April 1709.

She was the second named vessel since it was used for a 32-gun fifth rate built by Burgess & Briggs of Shoreham and taken by the French off the Scilly Islands on 1 August 1704.

Construction and Specifications
She was ordered on 16 March 1703 to be built at Chatham Dockyard under the guidance of Master Shipwright Robert Shortiss. She was launched on 10 March 1705. Her builder's measure tonnage was calculated as 411 tons (burthen).

The gun armament initially was four demi-culverins on the lower deck (LD) with two pair of guns per side. The upper deck (UD) battery would consist of between twenty and twenty-two 6-pounder guns with ten or eleven guns per side. The gun battery would be completed by four 4-pounder guns on the quarterdeck (QD) with two to three guns per side.

Commissioned Service 1705-1709
She was commissioned in 1705 under the command of Captain Charles Parsons for service in the Mediterranean. Captain Parsons was killed on the 11 February 1706. Captain Richard Lestock took command on 29 April 1706 and she sailed for Home Waters in September 1706. She returned to the Mediterranean to join Admiral John Leake's Fleet during the winter of 1707/08.

Loss
She was taken by two French 40-gun vessels of Capr Gato, Spain on 14 April 1709.

Notes

Citations

References

 Winfield (2009), British Warships in the Age of Sail (1603 – 1714), by Rif Winfield, published by Seaforth Publishing, England © 2009, EPUB 
 Colledge (2020), Ships of the Royal Navy, by J.J. Colledge, revised and updated by Lt Cdr Ben Warlow and Steve Bush, published by Seaforth Publishing, Barnsley, Great Britain, © 2020, EPUB 
 Lavery (1989), The Arming and Fitting of English Ships of War 1600 - 1815, by Brian Lavery, published by US Naval Institute Press © Brian Lavery 1989, Part V Guns, Type of Guns
 Clowes (1898), The Royal Navy, A History from the Earliest Times to the Present (Vol. II). London. England: Sampson Low, Marston & Company, © 1898

 

Frigates of the Royal Navy
Ships of the Royal Navy
1700s ships